Claessens is a Dutch patronymic surname meaning "son of Claes (Nicholas)". It may refer to:

Alain Claessens (1947–2004), French actor
Artus Claessens (fl. 1625–1644), Flemish still-life painter 
August Claessens (1885–1954), American politician
 (born 1981), Belgian theater and movie actor
Dieter Claessens (1921–1997), German sociologist
Dominicus Claessens ( – ), Flemish Baroque painter
François Claessens (1897–1971), Belgian gymnast
Gert Claessens (b. 1972), Belgian footballer
Jean Claessens (1908–1978), Belgian footballer
Lambertus Antonius Claessens (1762–1830), Flemish engraver and publisher
Olivier Claessens (b. 1988), Belgian footballer
Stijn Claessens (b. 1959), Dutch economist

See also
Claessen

Dutch-language surnames
Patronymic surnames